The Men's sprint event of the 2008 UCI Track Cycling World Championships was held on 30 March 2008.

Results

200 m time trial

Scratch

Individual pursuit

Points race

1 km time trial

Overall standings

References

External links
 Full results at Tissottiming.com

Men's sprint
UCI Track Cycling World Championships – Men's sprint